The Succession Act 1965 in Irish law was intended to provide for the surviving spouse of the deceased
if the deceased was intestate or specified a less than equitable share of the estate.  Up to then, Irish
citizens could apportion their estate as they wished without regard to the needs of their spouse or family.

References
Succession Act, 1965

1965 in Irish law
Acts of the Oireachtas of the 1960s